Barcelona attack may refer to:

 1938: Bombing of Barcelona, a series of airstrikes in the Spanish Civil War 
 1987: Hipercor bombing, by Basque separatists ETA
 1987: Bar Iruna attack, attack on Americans by Catalan separatists
 1990: Sabadell bombing, by ETA
 1991: Vic bombing, by ETA
 2015: Barcelona school killing by a 13-year-old boy
 2017: 2017 Barcelona attacks, a van-ramming attack into people on La Rambla by jihadists